Slovenskoye is a rural locality (a village) in Privodinskoye Urban Settlement of Kotlassky District, Arkhangelsk Oblast, Russia. The population was 1 as of 2010.

Geography 
Slovenskoye is located on the Severnaya Dvina River, 5 km west of Kotlas (the district's administrative centre) by road. Mezhnik is the nearest rural locality.

References 

Rural localities in Kotlassky District